Ragna Debats (born 22 March 1979) is a born Spanish Dutch female snowshoe runner, trail runner and sky runner. She was European champion in skyrunning (2017) and bronze medal at the world championships in the trail running (2016).

Biography
Ragna Debats, in addition to practicing skyrunning, is also a snowshoe running champion. In 2016 she won a silver medal at the 7th edition of the ISSF World Snowshoe Championships.

References

External links
Ragna Debats profile at ITRA

1979 births
Living people
Dutch sky runners
Dutch mountain runners
Trail runners
Snowshoe runners
Skyrunning World Championships winners
Dutch female long-distance runners
IAU Trail World Championships winners